Viamata Saddle (‘Sedlovina Viamata’ \se-dlo-vi-'na vi-a-'ma-ta\) is the ice-covered saddle of elevation 658 m on Brabant Island in the Palmer Archipelago, Antarctica, connecting Stavertsi Ridge on the east-northeast to Stribog Mountains on the west-southwest.  It is part of the glacial divide between Paré Glacier to the northwest and a part of the ice cap draining east-southeastwards into Hill Bay.

The saddle is named after the ancient Roman station of Viamata in Southern Bulgaria.

Location
British mapping in 1980 and 2008.

Maps
 Antarctic Digital Database (ADD). Scale 1:250000 topographic map of Antarctica. Scientific Committee on Antarctic Research (SCAR). Since 1993, regularly upgraded and updated.
British Antarctic Territory. Scale 1:200000 topographic map. DOS 610 Series, Sheet W 64 62. Directorate of Overseas Surveys, Tolworth, UK, 1980.
Brabant Island to Argentine Islands. Scale 1:250000 topographic map. British Antarctic Survey, 2008.

Notes

References
 Bulgarian Antarctic Gazetteer. Antarctic Place-names Commission. (details in Bulgarian, basic data in English)
 Viamata Saddle. SCAR Composite Antarctic Gazetteer.

External links
 Viamata Saddle. Copernix satellite image

Landforms of the Palmer Archipelago
Bulgaria and the Antarctic